Karol Łazar (born 7 July 1976) is a Polish rower. He competed in the men's quadruple sculls event at the 2000 Summer Olympics.

References

1976 births
Living people
Polish male rowers
Olympic rowers of Poland
Rowers at the 2000 Summer Olympics
Sportspeople from Gorzów Wielkopolski